Manfred Sexauer (August 2, 1930 - July 20, 2014) was a German radio and television host, most notable of the German music show Der Musikladen. From 1964 Sexauer worked as television moderator at Saarländischer Rundfunk. He was a recipient of the Saarland Order of Merit (1989) and the German Cross of Merit (2000).

References 

2014 deaths
1930 births
German radio presenters
German television presenters
Recipients of the Cross of the Order of Merit of the Federal Republic of Germany
Recipients of the Saarland Order of Merit
Radio Bremen people
ARD (broadcaster) people
Saarländischer Rundfunk people